This article lists political parties in Slovakia.
Slovakia has a democratic multi-party system with numerous political parties, established after the fall of communism in 1989 and shaped into the present form with Slovakia's independence in 1993. Since 1989 there has been altogether 236 registered political parties in the country, 61 are active as of March 2012.

In the Slovak political system usually no one party has a chance of gaining power alone, and parties must work with each other to form coalition governments, an exception being the parliamentary elections in 2012.

Active political parties

Parties with representation in the National Council

Parliamentary parties serving as non-affiliated

Extra-parliamentary parties

Inactive and cancelled political parties

Parties in liquidation
There are dozens of political parties currently in the process of being liquidated.

Defunct parties (1989 – present)
Agrarian Countryside Party (Agrárna Strana Vidieka) - founded in 2003. Dissolved in 2022.
Alliance of the New Citizen (Aliancia nového občana) – founded in 2001, government participation between 2002–05, extra-parliamentary since 2006, inactive in the late-2000s, legally succeeded by the 'Free Word Party of Nora Mojsejová' in 2011 and IDEA since 2013
Christian People's Party  (Kresťanská ľudová strana, KLS) - founded in 1998. Dissolved in 2018.
Civic Democratic Union (Občianska demokratická únia) - arose in 1991, its members are now in the Democratic Party and the small Civic Conservative Party (Občianska konzervatívna strana)
Civic Liberals (Občianski liberáli) - founded in 2004. Dissolved in 2020.
Conservative Democrats of Slovakia (Konzervatívni demokrati Slovenska) - Dissolved in 2014.
Democratic Union (Demokratická únia) - in the government between 1998 and 2002, now part of the Slovak Democratic and Christian Union
Direct Democracy (Priama Demokracia) - founded in 2008. Until 2013 it was named New Slovak Alternative, Civic-Liberal Party. Dissolved in 2022.
European Democratic Party (Európska Demokratická Strana) - founded in 2006. Dissolved in 2019.
Green Party (Strana zelených) -  Dissolved in 2022.
Greens - Party of National Prosperity - founded in 1990. Leader was Rudolf Pardubský. Until 2006 the party was named Party of National Prosperity. Dissolved in 2017.
Green Wave (Zelená vlna) - founded in 2009. Dissolved in 2017.
Homeland (VLASŤ) - founded in 2011. Until 2019 it was named Civic Party TODAY. Dissolved in 2021. 
Law and Justice (Právo a spravodlivosť) - founded in 2011. Leader was Peter Puškár. Dissolved in 2017.
Left Bloc (Ľavicový blok) - merged into Direction - Social Democracy in 2007/2008
Liberal Party - Formerly People's Union, the party split from the Movement for a Democratic Slovakia (HZDS) in 2003. Dissolved in 2021.
Magnificat Slovakia - fonded in 2012. Leader was Anton Selecký. The party is affiliated with the Christian NGO OZ Magnificat Slovakia. Dissolved in 2016.
Modern Slovak Society (Slovenská moderná spoločnosť) - founded in 2001 as Independent Party of the Unemployed. Dissolved in 2017.
Most-Híd - merged into Alliance (Slovak political party) in 2021.
New Democracy (Nová Demokracia) - The party split from the Movement for a Democratic Slovakia in 2009. Leader was Tibor Mikuš. Dissolved in 2016.
Party of Civic Understanding (Strana občianskeho porozumenia, SOP) - in the government between 1998 and 2002
Party of the Democratic Left (Strana demokratickej ľavice) - before 2002, arose in 1990 from the Communist Party of Slovakia
Party of the Democratic Left (Strana demokratickej ľavice, SDĽ) - Dissolved in 2015.
Party of the Hungarian Community - merged into Alliance (Slovak political party) in 2021.
Party of Patriots (Strana patriotov) - founded in 2010. Dissolved in 2018.
Public against Violence (Verejnosť proti násiliu) - the first party after the fall of the Communists in late 1989, ceased in 1991, split into the Movement for a Democratic Slovakia (HZDS) and the Civic Democratic Union (Občianska demokratická únia, ODU).
Roma initiative of Slovakia (Rómska iniciatíva Slovenska) - founded in 1996. Until 2000 the party was named Roma Intelligence for Co-Habitation in the Slovak Republic. Dissolved in 2022.
Slovak Democratic Coalition (Slovenská demokratická koalícia) - in existence from 1997 (as a coalition) / 1998 (as a party) to (?)2001, in the government from 1998 to 2001
Slovak Green Party (Strana zelených Slovenska) - Dissolved in 2022.
Slovak league (Slovenská liga) - founded in 2005 as Socialists. From 2005 to 2011 it was named Party of Civil Solidarity. From 2011 to 2019 it was named New Parliament. Dissolved in 2022.
Social Democratic Alternative (Sociálnodemokratická alternatíva)
Social Democratic Party of Slovakia (Sociálnodemokratická strana Slovenska) - arose in 1990, see also Alexander Dubček
True Slovak National Party (Pravá Slovenská národná strana) - Founded by Ján Slota in 2001 after being forced out of the Slovak National Party (SNS) by Anna Belousovová (at that time called Anna Malíková), the two parties re-merged in 2005 after both failing to get seats in the Parliament.
Part of the government between 1994 and 1998, The party dissolved in November 2017.
United Slovakia (Jednotné Slovensko) - founded in 2000. Dissloved in 2018.
We are Doing It for the Children - Free Forum - Dissolved in 2016.
We Have Had Enough! (Máme toho dosť!) - Dissolved in 2022.

Political parties in Slovakia (1948–1989)
Communist Party of Slovakia (1939) - leading force between 1948 and 1989
Party of Slovak Revival (Strana slovenskej obrody) - arose in 1948 from the Democratic Party (see above, see also National Front (Czechoslovakia)), ceased in late 1989 when the new Democratic Party was founded (see above)

Political parties in Slovakia (1945–1948)
Democratic Party (Demokratická strana) - an important party between 1944 and 1948, a new DS arose in 1989, since January 2006 part of the Slovak Democratic and Christian Union - Democratic Party
Freedom Party (Strana slobody) - Christian Republican party led by Vavro Šrobár.
Labour Party (Strana práce) - formed by Social Democrats who opposed cooperation with the Communist Party.

See also
 Politics of Slovakia
 List of political parties by country
 Politics of Communist Czechoslovakia
 List of political parties in Czechoslovakia

Notes

References

Slovakia
 
Political parties
Slovakia
Political parties